Cavalleria rusticana is an 1890 opera by Pietro Mascagni. The title may also refer to:
 Cavalleria rusticana (short story), an 1883 short story by Giovanni Verga; also a play by him based on his story
 Cavalleria rusticana (1953 film), a 1953 Italian film based on the opera
 Cavalleria Rusticana (1959 film), a 1959 Australian television play based on the opera
 Cavalleria rusticana (1982 film), a 1982 Italian film based on the opera